Shihomi Fukushima (born 19 June 1995) is a Japanese fencer. She won one of the bronze medals in the women's team sabre event at the 2018 Asian Games held in Jakarta, Indonesia.

In 2017, she won one of the bronze medals in the women's team sabre event at the Asian Fencing Championships held in Hong Kong. In that same year, she won the gold medal in the women's team sabre event at the 2017 Summer Universiade in Taipei, Taiwan. In 2019, she won one of the bronze medals in the women's sabre event at the Asian Fencing Championships held in Chiba, Japan. She also won the bronze medal in the women's team sabre event.

In 2021, she competed in the women's team sabre event at the 2020 Summer Olympics held in Tokyo, Japan. The Japanese team finished in 5th place.

References

External links 
 

1995 births
20th-century Japanese people
20th-century Japanese women
21st-century Japanese people
21st-century Japanese women
Asian Games bronze medalists for Japan
Asian Games medalists in fencing
Fencers at the 2018 Asian Games
Fencers at the 2020 Summer Olympics
Japanese female sabre fencers
Living people
Medalists at the 2017 Summer Universiade
Medalists at the 2018 Asian Games
Olympic fencers of Japan
People from Munakata, Fukuoka
Place of birth missing (living people)
Sportspeople from Fukuoka Prefecture
Universiade gold medalists for Japan
Universiade medalists in fencing
World Fencing Championships medalists